Aleksandr Vladimirovich Yatsko (born 1958) is a Soviet and Russian theater and film actor, director, Honored Artist of Russia (2005).

Biography
Aleksandr Yatsko was born on June 13, 1958 in   Minsk.

In 1980 he graduated from the architectural faculty of the Belarusian National Technical University. In 1985 he graduated from Moscow Art Theater School.

From 1985 to 1993 worked in the Taganka Theater, where he played   in the plays based on the works of Moliere, Maxim Gorky, Mikhail Bulgakov. Since 1993   actor of the Mossovet Theater).

From January to June 2016, he led the program  Disclosing Mystical Secrets  on  TV channel  Moscow Trust.

Career

Theater 
 Dog Waltz as Karl
 Ruy Blas as Don César de Bazan, comte de Garofa
 Suddenly Last Summer as Doctor
Mother Courage and Her Children as  regimental priest
 The Seagull as doctor
 Cyrano de Bergerac as  Comte Antoine de Guiche
 The Government Inspector as Mayor
 Jesus Christ Superstar as Pontius Pilate
 Les Liaisons dangereuses as Valmont
 Woe from Wit as Pavel Afanasyevich Famusov

Cinema
 The Secret Walk (1985) as Max von Görlitz, Wehrmacht Lieutenant
 The Russia House (1990) as Russian writer
 The Ice Runner (1993) as Dmitry
 Sacred Cargo (1995) as Oleg 
 The Peacemaker as Russian corporal
 Country of the Deaf (1998) as  The Albino
 House of Fools (2002) as episode
 Poor Nastya (2003) as Prince Aleksandr  Repnin
 Young Wolfhound (2007) as Tirgei
 Spiral (2014) as Boris
 Londongrad (2015) as Kiril Savenko
 Kitchen (2015) as Anton Vladimirovich
 To the Lake (2022) as Magus
 Aeterna (2022) as Count Larak, Chief Advisor to the Royal House

Personal life
Was married to actress Yelena Valyushkina (Formula of Love). They have two children:   son Vasily (1997) and daughter Maria (2003).

References

External links 
 
  Мне не нужен экстрим

 
1958 births
Actors from Minsk
Living people
Soviet male film actors
Russian male film actors
Russian male voice actors
Russian male television actors
Soviet male stage actors
Russian male stage actors
Russian theatre directors
Honored Artists of the Russian Federation
Moscow Art Theatre School alumni